Athamania is a former municipality in the Arta regional unit, Epirus, Greece. Since the 2011 local government reform it is part of the municipality Central Tzoumerka, of which it is a municipal unit. The municipal unit has an area of 304.979 km2. Population: 3,786 (2011). The seat of the municipality was in Vourgareli.

History
It is named after the Athamanians, an ancient Greek tribe that inhabited south-eastern Epirus and west Thessaly.

In 2011, during the local government reform, it merged with Agnanta, Melissourgoi, and Theodoriana to form the municipality of Central Tzoumerka.

References

Populated places in Arta (regional unit)